(born February 23, 1988) is a Japanese instructor of Shotokan karate.
 
She is currently an instructor at the Japan Karate Association honbu (headquarters) dojo.

Biography

She studied at Takushoku University.

Competition
Mai Shiina has had considerable success in karate competition.

Major Tournament Success
54th JKA All Japan Karate Championship (2011) - 1st Place Women's Kumite

References

 

Japanese female karateka
Karate coaches
Shotokan practitioners
Sportspeople from Chiba Prefecture
Takushoku University alumni
Living people
1988 births
21st-century Japanese women